Ruth Wodak   (born 12 July 1950 in London) is an Austrian linguist, who is Emeritus Distinguished Professor and Chair in Discourse Studies in the Department of Linguistics and English Language at Lancaster University and Professor in Linguistics at the University of Vienna.

Her research is mainly located in discourse studies and in critical discourse analysis. Together with her former colleagues and Ph.D students in Vienna (Rudolf de Cillia, Gertraud Benke, Helmut Gruber, Florian Menz, Martin Reisigl, Usama Suleiman, Christine Anthonissen), she elaborated the Discourse Historical Approach, an interdisciplinary, problem-oriented approach to analysing the change of discursive practices over time and in various genres.

She is member of the editorial board of a range of linguistic journals, co-editor of Discourse and Society, Critical Discourse Studies, and of the Journal of Language and Politics. She was the founding editor (together with Paul Chilton) of the book series Discourse Approaches to Politics, Society and Culture. She was also section editor of "Language and Politics" for the Second Edition of the Elsevier Encyclopedia of Language and Linguistics. Ruth Wodak chaired the Humanities and Social Sciences Panel for EURYI Award, in the European Science Foundation from 2006 to 2008.

Awards and honours
In 1996, she was awarded the Wittgenstein-Preis, the highest Austrian science award, for her projects focused on "Discourses on Un/employment in EU organizations; Debates on NATO and Neutrality in Austria and Hungary; The Discursive Construction of European Identities; Attitudes towards EU-Enlargement; Racism at the Top. Parliamentary Debates on Immigration in Six EU countries; The Discursive Construction of the Past - Individual and Collective Memories of the German Wehrmacht and the Second World War."

In October 2006, she was awarded the Woman's Prize of the City of Vienna.

She was awarded the Kerstin Hesselgren Chair of the Swedish Parliament and stayed at University of Örebro, Sweden, from March to June 2008.

In December 2011, Professor Karl Heinz Töchterle, Minister of Science and Education, presented her with the Grand Decoration of Honour in Silver for Services to the Republic of Austria (Großes Silbernes Ehrenzeichen für Verdienste um die Republik Österreich), in Vienna, on behalf of the President of Austria, Dr Heinz Fischer. "The award citation emphasises the social relevance and impact of her outstanding research on the discursive construction of national and transnational identities and patterns of racism, xenophobia and anti-Semitism."

She was elected Fellow of the Academy of Social Sciences in 2013.

Ruth Wodak has been a Fulbright Austria Scholar at Stanford University. She has held visiting professorships at Uppsala University, University of Minnesota, and Georgetown University, and a Leverhulme Visiting Professorship at the University of East Anglia.

Selected bibliography

Books
Wodak, Ruth (2015). The Politics of Fear: What Right-Wing Populist Discourses Mean. London: Sage.
Wodak, Ruth (2011). The Discourse of Politics in Action: Politics as Usual (2nd revised edition). Basingstoke: Palgrave Macmillan.
Reisigl, Martin & Wodak, Ruth (2001). Discourse and Discrimination. London: Routledge.
Wodak, Ruth (1996). Disorders of Discourse. London: Longman.

Edited books
Wodak, Ruth, & Forchtner, Bernhard (Eds.) (2017). The Routledge Handbook of Language and Politics. London: Routledge.
Wodak, Ruth, Mral, Brigitte, & Khosravinik, Majid (Eds.) (2013). Right Wing Populism in Europe: Politics and Discourse. London: Bloomsbury Academic.
Wodak, Ruth (Ed.) (2013). Critical Discourse Analysis: Four Volumes. Sage. 
Wodak, Ruth, Johnstone, Barbara, & Kerswill, Paul (Eds.) (2011). The Sage Handbook of Sociolinguistics. Los Angeles: Sage.
Wodak, Ruth & Meyer, Michael (Eds.) (2009). Methods of Critical Discourse Analysis (2nd revised edition). London: Sage.
Wodak, Ruth & Reisigl, Martin (Eds.) (2009). The Discursive Construction of National Identity. Edinburgh: EUP.
Wodak, Ruth & Koller, Veronika (Eds.) (2008). Handbook of Communication in the Public Sphere. Berlin: De Gruyter.
Wodak, Ruth, & Krzyzanowski, Michal (2008). Qualitative Discourse Analysis in the Social Sciences. Basingstoke: Palgrave Macmillan.
Wodak, Ruth & Chilton, Paul (Eds.) (2005). New Agenda in (Critical) Discourse Analysis. Amsterdam: John Benjamins.
Weiss, Gilbert & Wodak, Ruth (Eds.) (2003). Critical Discourse Analysis: Theory and Interdisciplinarity. Basingstoke: Palgrave Macmillan.
Wodak, Ruth, de Cillia, Rudolf, Reisigl, Martin, & Liebhart, Karin (Eds.) (1999). The Discursive Construction of National Identity. Edinburgh: EUP.
Wodak, Ruth (Ed.) (1997). Gender and Discourse. London: Sage.
Wodak, Ruth (Ed.) (1989). Language, Power and Ideology: Studies in Political Discourse. Amsterdam: John Benjamins.

References

External links
Staff page at Lancaster University
Profile at Academia.edu
Language, Ideology and Power Research Group
Journal of Language and Politics
Fulbright Austria
 Entry for Ruth Wodak at OCLC Worldcat Classify

Linguists
Sociolinguists
Applied linguists
Discourse analysts
Academics of Lancaster University
Academics of the University of East Anglia
Academic staff of Örebro University
1950 births
Living people
Recipients of the Grand Decoration for Services to the Republic of Austria
Fellows of the Academy of Social Sciences
Austrian women academics
Linguists from Austria
Women linguists
University of Vienna alumni
Department of Linguistics and English Language, Lancaster University
20th-century linguists
21st-century linguists